Garrison Cemetery, also known as the War of 1812 Cemetery, is a historic cemetery located at Cheektowaga in Erie County, New York.  It is the final resting place for American and British soldiers who fought in the Niagara Frontier Campaign of the War of 1812.  The cemetery is located on the site of the General Military Hospital, established August 1, 1814, at Williams Mill.

It was listed on the National Register of Historic Places in 2002.

Gallery

References

External links

 War of 1812 Cemetery – Cheektowaga, NY – Veteran Cemeteries on Waymarking.com
 History of the Garrison Cemetery
 

Cemeteries on the National Register of Historic Places in New York (state)
1814 establishments in New York (state)
Cemeteries in Erie County, New York
National Register of Historic Places in Erie County, New York